Pod is a series of digital guitar amplifier modelers from Line 6. Pods are designed to digitally simulate amplifiers. Most Pods also include cabinet models, and all Pods include effects models. All Pod variants include headphone ports and recording ports, and can be used to feed a signal into an amp or directly into a PA system. Some variants include USB for direct recording interface with a computer.

POD users include Dino Cazares of Fear Factory, who was one of the first professional users, and Justin Broadrick of Godflesh and Jesu.

Product models and variants

Studio

POD 1.0 – 16 guitar amp models
POD 2.0 – 32 guitar amp models
POD xt – 36 guitar amp models
POD xt PRO – 36 guitar amp models
POD X3 – 78 guitar amp models and 28 bass amp models
POD X3 Pro – 78 guitar amp models and 28 bass amp models
Bass POD xt – 28 bass amp models
Bass POD xt Pro – 28 bass amp models
POD HD – 16 guitar amp models
POD HD Pro – 25 guitar amp models
POD HD Pro X – 25 guitar amp models

Stage
The Floor POD and Live series are variants of the standard PODs designed for live stage performance. They are similar in appearance to an effects pedal combined with a simplified mixing console.
Floor POD – 12 guitar amp models.
Floor POD Plus – 32 guitar amp models
POD xt Live – 42 guitar amp models
POD X3 Live – 78 guitar amp models and 28 bass amp models
Bass Floor POD – 5 bass amp models
Bass POD xt Live – 28 bass amp models
POD HD300 – 16 guitar amp models
POD HD400 – 16 guitar amp models
POD HD500 – 22 guitar amp models
POD HD500X – 30 guitar amp models

Mobile
Pocket POD – A pocket-sized POD designed for easier portability, featuring 32 guitar amp models
Pocket POD Express – A budget version of the Pocket POD, featuring five guitar amp models

References

External links
 Line 6 Pod product line

Instrument amplifiers